Faik Pasha (1876 – 30 August 1916), also known as Ahmed Faik or Sulejmani Faik or by his nickname "Çolak" Faik,  was a general of the Ottoman Army, and the grandmaster of Freemasonry in the Ottoman Empire.

Military career

After graduating from Kuleli Military High School, Faik entered the Ottoman Imperial School of Military Engineering (Mühendishane-i Berrî-i Hümâyûn). He subsequently graduated from the Ottoman Military College as a staff captain on 17 January 1900, after which he was appointed to the island of Sisam (now known as Samos). In 1909, when he was a lieutenant colonel (Kaymakam), he was assigned to Debre Mustarrıflığı.

Balkan Wars

He served during the Balkan Wars as Chief of Staff of the VII Corps of the Western Army. The commander was Mirliva Fethi Pasha, who was killed in action while trying to stop the withdrawal of Ottoman soldiers from Koçişte Hill near Monastir in 1912. Faik Bey was promoted to the rank of lieutenant colonel for his efforts during the battle. He was one of the few successful Ottoman officers of the army during that war. Faik Bey was made commander of 19th Infantry Division. In 1912, the division fought the Greeks in Yanya (now known as Ioanina). Faik Bey became pasha and the commander of the Independent Cavalry Division.

Gallipoli campaign

At the beginning of the Gallipoli campaign, Faik was commander of II Corps. With two divisions, the corps came under the command of Liman von Sanders's Fifth Army. Lieutenant General Weber Pasha wanted Faik Pasha to command the "Right Wing". But Liman von Sanders disliked him and he had a quarrel with Faik Pasha about tactics. Weber Pasha insisted on his decision. At last, unwillingly, von Sanders appointed Faik Pasha to the command of Right Wing.

He fought during the Battle of Gully Ravine (28 June – 3 July 1915), which was a very bloody battle that resulted in a large number of Ottoman casualties. The casualties of the 3rd Battalion, 70th Regiment, on 2 July 1915, amounted to six officers killed, four wounded and 158 personnel killed. In addition, a further 285 were wounded.

Caucasus campaign

In 1916, Faik commanded the Ottoman II Corps during the Caucasus campaign. He was shot and killed during fighting around the Çavreşi mountains on 30 August 1916.

Freemasonry
During his stay in the Balkans, he was initiated as a freemason in Resne (Resen). After the resignment of Grand Master Most Worshipful Talaat Pasha, Faik was elected as Grand Master on 18 October 1912. Most Worshipfull Grand Master Faik Pasha reigned until 14 April 1913.

Sources

 İsmail Tosun Saral, Büyük Üstad Şehid Faik Paşa ("Grand Master Faik Pasha the Martyr")

1876 births
1916 deaths
People from Veles, North Macedonia
Ottoman Imperial School of Military Engineering alumni
Ottoman Military College alumni
Ottoman military personnel of the Balkan Wars
Ottoman military personnel of World War I
Ottoman Army generals
Pashas
Albanians from the Ottoman Empire
Ottoman military personnel killed in World War I